Sir John Kothalawala College (Sir John Kothalawala Maha Vidyalaya) is a public college in the city of Kurunegala, Sri Lanka. It was established on 16 January 1974 and was formerly known as Bandaranayake Vidyalaya.

History

Sir John Kothalawala College opened on 16 January 1974 in the palace of Bishop Lakdasa De Mel. At that time, the bishop's palace was used for classrooms. The college was initially known as Bandaranayake Vidyalaya and was under the sponsorship of Piyadasa Wijesinghe, a former member of parliament. The objective in the establishment of the school was to provide more opportunities for youth from rural communities, away from overcrowded and competitive popular schools. The college opened with six teachers and fourteen students. With 175 teachers and 4600 students, it is the largest school in North Western Province.

School Flag
The school flag is mainly coloured green, the official colour of the school. The school crest is at the bottom of the flag. There are four coloured strips, in the colours of the four school houses, at the hoist of the flag.

Principals

Past Names of the school

Sports

Annual Big Match
The Battle of Greens is the annual big cricket match between Sir John Kothalawala College and Wayamba Royal College. Sir John Kothalawala College won the last match in 2016.

Annual Sports Meet
There is an annual sporting meet. Students are divided into four houses: Thissa, Vijaya, Gemunu, and Perakum.

Notable Achievements 
 Top 10 Men's 400m,Youth Olympic 2018 - Dilan Bogoda

References

External links
 Facebook page

Provincial schools in Sri Lanka
Schools in Kurunegala